Leidissoo Nature Reserve is a nature reserve situated in Lääne County, Estonia. Since 2010, this nature reserve belongs to Ramsar sites.

The area of the nature reserve is 8221 ha.

References

Nature reserves in Estonia
Ramsar sites in Estonia
Geography of Lääne County
Tourist attractions in Lääne County